Piz Davo Lais is a mountain of the Silvretta Alps, located between the Val Fenga and the Val Sinestra in the canton of Graubünden.

References

External links
 Piz Davo Lais on Hikr

Mountains of the Alps
Alpine three-thousanders
Mountains of Graubünden
Mountains of Switzerland
Valsot